The Canadian Security Intelligence Service (CSIS, ; , SCRS) is Canada's primary national intelligence agency. It is responsible for collecting, analysing, reporting and disseminating intelligence on threats to Canada's national security, and conducting operations, covert and overt, within Canada and abroad. The agency also reports to and advises the minister of public safety on national security issues and situations that threaten the security of the nation.

CSIS is headquartered in Ottawa, Ontario, in a purpose-built facility completed in 1995. The agency is responsible to Parliament through the minister of public safety, and it is overseen by the National Security and Intelligence Review Agency. CSIS is also subject to review by the Federal Court. CSIS agents are not allowed to make arrests.

The agency is led by a director, the ninth and current being David Vigneault, who assumed the role on June 19, 2017.

History
Prior to 1984, security intelligence in Canada was the purview of the Royal Canadian Mounted Police (RCMP). However, during the 1970s, there were allegations that the RCMP Security Service – the predecessor to CSIS – had been involved in numerous illegal activities. As a result of these allegations, Justice David McDonald was appointed in 1977 to investigate the activities of the RCMP Security Service. The resulting investigation, known as the McDonald Commission, published its final report in 1981, with its main recommendation being that security intelligence work should be separated from policing, and that a civilian intelligence agency be created to take over from the RCMP Security Service.

On June 21, 1984, CSIS was created by an Act of Parliament. At the time, it was also decided that the activities of this new agency, the Canadian Security Intelligence Service, should be subject to both judicial approval for warrants and to general review by a new body, the Security Intelligence Review Committee, as well as the office of the Inspector General (which was disbanded in 2012). Its de facto existence began on July 16 under the direction of Thomas D'Arcy Finn.

At first, the main emphasis of CSIS was combating the activities of various foreign intelligence agencies operating in Canada. For example, it has been engaged in investigating economic espionage involving Chinese operations throughout Canada. While the threat posed by foreign intelligence agencies still remains, CSIS over the years since 9/11 has focused more and more on the threat to Canadian security and its citizens posed by terrorist activity, and this has led to the memorable cases of Maher Arar and Omar Khadr.

The institutional focus of CSIS returned to state actors (such as Russia and China) after a February 2021 speech by the CSIS director, David Vigneault, warned that the Chinese "strategy for geopolitical advantage on all fronts — economic, technological, political and military" uses "all elements of state power to carry out activities that are a direct threat to our national security and sovereignty."

Leadership
The leadership position is mostly a political appointment.

Coulombe and Yaworski were promoted from the ranks within CSIS. Vigneault had held a management posting with CSIS. Neufeld had joined CSIS in 1984 after being in the RCMP.

Finn was previously assistant secretary to the federal cabinet for security and intelligence matters in the 1970s.

Neufeld (RCMP) and Vigneault (CBSA, CSE) have law enforcement backgrounds.

 Ted Finn 1984–1987
 Reid Morden 1988–1992
 Ray Protti 1992–1994
 Ward Elcock 1994–2004
 Dale Neufeld* - Acting Director from May to November 2004
 Jim Judd 2004–2009
 Richard Fadden 2009–2013
 Michel Coulombe 2013–2017
 Jeffrey Yaworski* 2017 as interim director and returned to role as deputy director before retiring in 2019. Joined CSIS in 1985.
 David Vigneault 2017–present

Insignia
CSIS is one of several federal agencies (primarily those involved with law enforcement, security, or having a regulatory function) that have been granted a heraldic badge. The badge was created in July 1984 (pre-dating the creation of the Canadian Heraldic Authority).  The badge received royal approval in June 1985.

On December 21, 2016, a CSIS flag was raised for the first time by the director at the national headquarters. The flag displays the CSIS badge on a white field.

Mission and operations

CSIS is a federal national security agency which conducts national security investigations and security intelligence collection. CSIS collects and analyzes intelligence, then advises the Government of Canada on issues and activities that may threaten the security of Canada and its citizens. These threats include terrorism, espionage and foreign interference in Canadian affairs, proliferation of weapons of mass destruction, and information security threats. The agency is also responsible for the security screening program.

There is no restriction in the Canadian Security Intelligence Service Act on where CSIS may collect "security intelligence" or information relating to threats to the security of Canada. The Service can collect three sorts of datasets: a publicly available dataset, a dataset which belongs to an approved class which is defined by the Minister, and a dataset that "predominantly relates to non-Canadians who are outside Canada."

There is a distinction between "security intelligence" and "foreign intelligence". Security intelligence pertains to national security threats (e.g., terrorism, espionage). Foreign intelligence involves information collection relating to the political or economic activities of foreign states. Previous law stated that CSIS was only allowed to collect this intelligence within Canada but due to an updated law in 2016 they are now allowed to collect that intelligence abroad as well.

CSIS has served in many different countries, especially after 9/11. Examples of some of the countries they have served in are: Afghanistan, Iraq, Syria, Lebanon, Mali, Libya, Sudan, Pakistan, Somalia, Qatar, Kuwait and the United Arab Emirates.

CSIS is neither a police agency nor is it a part of the military. As an intelligence agency, the primary role of CSIS is not law enforcement. Investigation of criminal activity is left to the RCMP and local (provincial, regional or municipal) police agencies. CSIS, like counterparts such as the UK Security Service (MI5) and the US Central Intelligence Agency (CIA), is a civilian agency. CSIS is subject to review by the National Security and Intelligence Review Agency (NSIRA) as well as other legislative checks and balances. The agency carries out its functions in accordance with the Canadian Security Intelligence Service Act, which governs and defines its powers and activities.

Canadian police, military agencies (Canadian Forces Intelligence Branch), and numerous other government departments may maintain their own "intelligence" components (i.e. to analyze criminal intelligence or military strategic intelligence). Global Affairs Canada maintains a Security and Intelligence Bureau to review and analyze overtly acquired information. The bureau plays a coordinating and policy role. While not an intelligence agency, it is responsible for the security of Global Affairs Canada personnel around the world. However, these agencies are not to be confused with the more encompassing work of larger, more dedicated "intelligence agencies" such as CSIS, MI5, MI6, or the CIA.

As Canada's contributor of human intelligence to the Five Eyes, CSIS works closely with the intelligence agencies of the United States, United Kingdom, Australia, and New Zealand. Under the post-World War II Quadripartite (UKUSA) Agreement, intelligence information is shared between the intelligence agencies of these five countries.

It is widely speculated that CSIS employees similar to Security Intelligence Officers are posted at Canadian Embassies abroad in order to collect foreign intelligence. However, there is no evidence of this, and is only a speculation.

CSIS was named one of "Canada's Top 100 Employers" by Mediacorp Canada Inc. for the years of 2009–2011, and was featured in Maclean's newsmagazine.

Organization

Regional

CSIS headquarters is located in Ottawa, Ontario and is responsible for the overall operations. Regionally, Canada is broken down into six subordinate regions; the Atlantic, Quebec, Ottawa, Toronto, Prairie, and British Columbia Regions.

These regions are responsible for investigating any threat to Canada and its allies as defined by the Canadian Security Intelligence Service Act. They liaise with the various federal, provincial, municipal and private sector entities found within their areas of responsibility. They also conduct various outreach programs with different community and cultural groups, universities, and private sector organizations in an effort to provide a better understanding, and to clear up any misunderstandings of the role of CSIS. All these regions also border the US and they therefore maintain contact with their US federal counterparts.

Atlantic Region
The Atlantic Region encompasses the four Atlantic provinces (Nova Scotia, New Brunswick, Newfoundland and Labrador, and Prince Edward Island) and is the smallest of the six CSIS regions. Its main office is located in Halifax, with two district offices in Fredericton and St. John's.

Quebec Region
This region is responsible solely for the province of Quebec. Its main office is in Montreal, with one district office in Quebec City.

Ottawa and Toronto Regions
These two regions are responsible for operations in Ontario (except for NW Ontario). There are four district offices located in Niagara Falls, Windsor, Downtown Toronto and at Toronto Pearson International Airport.

Prairie Region
Geographically, this represents the largest of the six regions and encompasses the area of Ontario north and west of Thunder Bay, Manitoba, Saskatchewan, Alberta and the three northern territories of Yukon, Northwest Territories and Nunavut. The regional office is located in Edmonton with three district offices located in Winnipeg, Regina and Calgary.

British Columbia
This region is responsible for the province of British Columbia. Its main office is located in downtown Burnaby with a district office at the Vancouver International Airport.

Executive Structure
CSIS is functionally divided into three Deputy Directorates and five Assistant Directorates 

 Deputy Director Operations
 Assistant Director Collection
 Assistant Director Requirements
 Deputy Director Administration and Chief Financial Officer
 Deputy Director Policy and Strategic Partnerships
 Assistant Director Legal Services
 Assistant Director Technology
 Assistant Director Human Resources
CSIS also houses a Chief Audit and Evaluation Executive and a Senior Officer for Disclosure of Wrongdoing.

Weapons
CSIS officers stationed in foreign flashpoints, such as Afghanistan, carry unspecified guns, however they are not authorized to bear arms inside Canada. It is widely speculated that the CSIS uses the Smith & Wesson 5906, the Colt Canada C8 and the Colt Canada C7A2

Training 
CSIS Intelligence Officers are required to complete the Intelligence Officer Entry Training (IOET) program at CSIS HQ in Ottawa, Ontario, followed by a three-year development program. Intelligence Officers are put on probation for at least a year upon completion of the IOET.

Secret Court

According to L'Hebdo Journal, it is reported that some senior officials of the service would go to a bunker in Ottawa to file and discuss warrant applications with judges designated by the Federal Court. However, the site of this secret court is not located.

Research, analysis and production 
The RAP was reorganized in 1996–1997 in order to better coordinate with the Intelligence Assessment Secretariat of the Privy Council Office. It has four sub-divisions: Counter Intelligence, Foreign Intelligence, Counter-terrorism and Distribution.

Oversight
As part of an omnibus national security bill passed by the Parliament in 2019, the oversight and reporting regime for CSIS was overhauled. The previous agency that handled all oversight of CSIS, the Security Intelligence Review Committee (SIRC) was replaced by a new agency, the National Security & Intelligence Review Agency (NSIRA), which now includes oversight of all national security and intelligence activities undertaken by any agency of the Government of Canada.

The reforms also included the creation of a new Intelligence Commissioner who reports to Parliament and has quasi-judicial oversight of all national security matters.

National Security and Intelligence Committee of Parliamentarians (NSICOP) is the primary oversight committee in regards to Canadian Intelligence. The committee performs strategic and systematic reviews of the legislative, regulatory, policy, expenditure and administrative frameworks under which national security activities are conducted. The committee is composed of members from the House of Commons and Senate. While members are made up of Members of Parliament, the committee is not a standing committee nor a special committee of Parliament. Rather, it is an agency of the executive branch, itself overseen by the Prime Minister's Office.

Controversies

In 1997, the Royal Canadian Mounted Police collaborated with CSIS on Project Sidewinder, a study alleging China had set up a foreign influence network in Canada. The RCMP accused CSIS of "watering down" the report.

In several instances, CSIS has been accused of misrepresenting facts to the courts. In 2013, CSIS was censured by Federal Court Judge Richard Mosley for deliberately misleading the Federal Court to make it possible for them to allow other agencies to spy on Canadians abroad, which is not allowed by Canadian law. Mosley found that "CSIS breached its duty of candour to the Court by not disclosing information that was relevant," the Federal Court stated in a press release.

CSIS has also been involved in cases where evidence has been mishandled or omitted from the Courts. In 2009, it was alleged that the service did not disclose information that their confidential informants, which CSIS had been relying on to gather information about their targets, were either deceptive, or failed lie-detector tests. This was not an isolated case, and in several other instances, the agency mishandling of evidence has also called for investigation.

Crown prosecutor James Jardine expressed frustration with CSIS to the Commission of Inquiry into the Investigation of the Bombing of Air India Flight 182, headed by Justice John C. Major. Two Canadian courts have publicly criticized CSIS for destroying wiretap evidence. One court commented on the importance of wiretap evidence from CSIS in establishing guilt. The second focused on its exculpatory value.
From 1988 to 1994, CSIS mole Grant Bristow infiltrated the Canadian white-supremacist movement. When the story became public knowledge, the press aired concerns that he had not only been one of the founders of the Heritage Front group, but that he had also channelled CSIS funding to the group.

On September 18, 2006, the Arar Commission absolved CSIS of any involvement in the extraordinary rendition by the United States of a Canadian citizen, Maher Arar. The commission found that US authorities sent Arar to Jordan and then Syria (his country of birth) based on incorrect information which had been provided by the RCMP to the US government. Arar was held by the Syrians for one year and was tortured. The sole criticism of CSIS leveled by the commission was that the agency should do more to critically examine information provided by regimes which practice torture.

On March 31, 2009, CSIS lawyer and advisor Geoffrey O'Brian told the Committee on Public Safety and National Security that CSIS would use information obtained by torture if it could prevent another attack such as 9/11 or the Air India bombing. Testifying before the same committee two days later, the director of CSIS, Jim Judd said that O'Brian "may have been confused" and "venturing into a hypothetical", and would send the committee a clarifying letter. Two weeks later CSIS announced that Judd would be retiring in June, five months before the end of his five-year term.

Prominent Canadian national security lawyer Barbara Jackman has also been critical, categorizing the research by CSIS as "sloppy" and that its officers are "susceptible to tunnel vision".

In 2017, several CSIS members accused the organization of having a racist and homophobic workplace culture.

In 2018, CSIS was accused by Canadian lawmakers of purposely giving money to former terrorists-turned-informants for more information, CSIS repeatedly denied this. However several weeks later their Director David Vigneault would appear in front of Canada's Parliament to testify regarding the act.

References

External links

CSIS news archive at The Canadian Intelligence Resource Centre (CIRC)
38th PARLIAMENT, 1st SESSION contains a review of the roles of CSIS and the RCMP role under the Anti-Terrorism Act.

 
1984 establishments in Canada
Security Intelligence Service
Federal departments and agencies of Canada
Government agencies established in 1984
Public Safety Canada